The 2021–22 Hobart Hurricanes Women's season was the seventh in the team's history. Coached by Salliann Beams and captained by Rachel Priest, the Hurricanes were scheduled to play three of 14 WBBL07 games at Blundstone Arena in Hobart, and five in Launceston (four at UTAS Stadium and one at the neighbouring Invermay Park). They ended the regular season in sixth place on the ladder, failing to qualify for finals for a fifth consecutive campaign despite achieving their best finishing position since WBBL02.

Squad 
Each 2021–22 squad was made up of 15 active players. Teams could sign up to five 'marquee players', with a maximum of three of those from overseas. Marquees were defined as any overseas player, or a local player who holds a Cricket Australia national contract at the start of the WBBL|07 signing period.

Personnel changes made ahead of the season included:

 South African marquee Lizelle Lee initially signed with the Hurricanes, departing the Renegades. However, Lee withdrew from the tournament weeks before its commencement. Indian marquee Richa Ghosh filled the vacancy, signing with the Hurricanes to make her first appearance in the league.
 Barbadian marquee Hayley Matthews and South African marquee Chloe Tryon did not re-sign with the Hurricanes.
 South African marquee Mignon du Preez signed with the Hurricanes, departing the Melbourne Stars.
 Molly Strano signed with the Hurricanes, departing the Melbourne Renegades.
 Corinne Hall departed the Hurricanes, signing with the Sydney Thunder.
 Nell Bryson-Smith departed the Hurricanes after a season as a replacement player, signing with the Adelaide Strikers.
 Brooke Hepburn departed the Hurricanes, retiring after WBBL|06.
 Emma Flint would be unavailable for the season due to maternity leave.
 Rachel Trenaman signed with the Hurricanes, departing the Sydney Thunder. Trenaman would not be available for the season due to injury.
 Rachel Priest was appointed captain, replacing Corinne Hall (7–27 win–loss record).

Squad details during the season included:

 Rachel Priest sustained a broken finger on the first ball of the Hurricanes' bowling innings in a match on 27 October. Richa Ghosh performed wicket-keeping duties for the remainder of the match, though Priest resumed her role for all subsequent fixtures.

The table below lists the Hurricanes players and their key stats (including runs scored, batting strike rate, wickets taken, economy rate, catches and stumpings) for the season.

Ladder

Fixtures 
All times are local

Statistics and awards 

 Most runs: Mignon du Preez – 414 (7th in the league)
 Highest score in an innings: Rachel Priest – 107* (68) vs Melbourne Stars, 19 October 2021
 Most wickets: Molly Strano – 15 (equal 9th in the league)
 Best bowling figures in an innings: Ruth Johnston – 4/8 (3.2 overs) vs Melbourne Stars, 19 October 2021
 Most catches (fielder): Richa Ghosh, Naomi Stalenberg – 5 each (equal 16th in the league)
 Player of the Match awards:
 Rachel Priest – 2
 Mignon du Preez, Ruth Johnston, Belinda Vakarewa – 1 each
 WBBL|07 Player of the Tournament: Mignon du Preez (equal 5th)
 WBBL|07 Team of the Tournament: Tayla Vlaeminck
 Hurricanes Player of the Tournament: Tayla Vlaeminck

References 

2021–22 Women's Big Bash League season by team
Hobart Hurricanes (WBBL)